Andrew Wesley Stuart (February 11, 1902 – November 29, 1984) was a  Canadian commercial fisherman and politician from the Province of New Brunswick.

Known by Wes, he was born at Deer Island, New Brunswick, the son of Andrew Holmes Stuart and Laura Gertrude Thompson. Raised in a place where fishing was a major part of the economy, in addition to fishing for a living, he worked as a government fishing industry inspector.

In the 1945 Canadian federal election, Stuart was elected as the Liberal Party's candidate for the riding of Charlotte. He was reelected in 1949, 1953, and again in 1957.

Wesley Stuart lived on the bank of the St. Croix River and as was common for residents, he frequently travelled across the border to Maine. A proponent of free trade between Canada and the United States, in 1951 Stuart received much publicly in both countries for his statements in the House of Commons of Canada on cross-border smuggling. Time magazine reported that he declared he had "been a smuggler all his life—and intended to keep on being one," adding that he "never came through [the border] in my lifetime that I did not smuggle something." Stuart's straight talk met with wide approval by his constituents and in the ensuing federal election, he won his third term in office with the largest majority of his political career.

In the 1958 electoral sweep by the Progressive Conservatives under John Diefenbaker, Stuart lost his seat to Caldwell Stewart. While remaining active in politics, he was the runner up to Louis Robichaud in a bid for leader of the provincial Liberals later in 1958 and went on to serve as the New Brunswick Liberal Party President from 1960 to 1963.

On October 23, 1924, he married Julia Marguerite Graham (1899–1961) . The couple had three children (Janet Saint, Roy Graham "Bud" Stuart, and Jacqueline (Jackie) Smith). Wesley Stuart died in 1984. He and his wife are buried in the St. Andrews, New Brunswick Rural Cemetery.

Electoral history

References

November 12, 1951 Time magazine article titled "Case of the Smuggling M.P."

1902 births
1984 deaths
Canadian fishers
Members of the House of Commons of Canada from New Brunswick
Liberal Party of Canada MPs
People from Saint Andrews, New Brunswick